Decorate is the verb associated with Decoration

Decorate can also refer to:
Decorate (album), a 2010 studio album by Yuna
Decorate (EP), a 2011 EP by Yuna

See also
Decorated (disambiguation)